Volvox globator is a species of green algae of the genus Volvox. It was originally described by Carl Linnaeus in his 1758 work Systema Naturae. In 1856 its sexuality was described by Ferdinand Cohn and is the same as Sphaeroplea annulina. It is colonial flagellate found in freshwaters. The colony consists of thousands of zooids (somatic cells) arranged in a single peripheral layer. each zooids shows two flagella, two or more contractile vacuoles, cup like chloroplast, a single nucleus, a red stigma but no gullet. Nutrition is holophytic. Size of colony increases by binary fission. In the colony the zooids called parthenogonidia repeatedly divide to form daughter colonies which are released from parent colony.

References

Further reading

Chlamydomonadales
Plants described in 1758
Taxa named by Carl Linnaeus